Pradharshini is the annual intercollege Cultural festival held at Kilpauk Medical College, one of the premier medical colleges in Tamil Nadu, India. It has been held every year since 1986. It is usually held in the last week of September for 3 days and 4 nights. Pradharshini is considered as one of the biggest cultural festivals of South-India and the biggest conducted by any medical college.

Origin
Pradharshini means "An Exhibition of Art" roughly translated into Tamil as "Kalaimagalin Dharisanam"

Organization
Pradharshini is conducted by the students of Kilpauk Medical College

History

Pradharshini was started in 1986 as a small event with participation from only a handful of colleges. It has continued to grow and now every year it witnesses a participation from over 100 colleges

Events
The most popular of the events at Pradharshini are

Western Music

Light Music

Variety Variety

Fashion

Choreo Night

Minor events
Some of the other events that are conducted at Pradharshini include, 

 Channel Surfing
 Kaviarangam
 Rangoli
 Pattimandram 
 Painting
 Face Painting
 Solo Singing
 Duet Singing
 Instrumentals
 Gaming
 Photography
 Short Film Making
 Shipwreck
 Antyakshari
 Creative Writing
 Cine Quiz
 Hair Styling
 Adzap
 Jam
 General Quiz
 Body Building
 Mono Acting
 Solo Dancing
 Duet Dancing

References

External links
 Official Facebook Page of Pradharshini

Culfests
College festivals in India